Fakta fra verden (Norwegian for "Facts from the world") is a Norwegian comic strip written and drawn by Karstein Volle, since 2001.

The comic has an educational theme and each episode is written and drawn like an educational message. However, the facts that the strip claims to present are always completely absurd.

External links
 Fakta fra verden: Kors på halsen at Jippi Comics
 Fakta fra verden: Med hånden på hjertet at Jippi Comics

Norwegian comic strips